Barsaat Ki Ek Raat  is a 1981 Bollywood thriller film starring Amitabh Bachchan, Raakhee, Amjad Khan and Utpal Dutt. It was directed by Shakti Samanta. The film was simultaneously shot in two languages, Hindi and Bengali. The Bengali version, titled Anusandhan, became the highest grossing Bengali film of all time and remained at the spot for several years. The story was adapted from the novel Anushandhan by Shaktipada Rajguru. The Hindi version was an average grosser.

The film is remembered for the classic songs "Haye Wo Pardesi",“Apne Pyar Ke Sapne Sach Hue” and “Kaliram Ka Khul Gaya Pol”. The first song was remade by the Bombay Bicycle Club and the second was used in the international song Funky Bijou Anthem.

Plot
In a small village in Darjeeling, Sahuji (Utpal Dutt) the merchant has woven a web of corruption in every layer of the social fabric. He supplies materials of inferior quality to the tea garden, and then bribes the accountants to pass his bills. When one of the
managers, called "Boro Babu", (Abhi Bhattacharya), resists, Sahuji pays the workers to go on a strike against the Boro Babu. Besides, he is also involved in rampant smuggling of goods across the border, and everyone from the local jeweler to the local police inspector are part of his intricate web.

While the father has created a position of influence by spreading corruption, his son Kaaliram (Amjad Khan) has ushered in a reign of terror. He goes to local bars, drinks, and doesn't pay. Anyone standing in his way gets beaten up mercilessly, either by him or his thugs. After getting sufficiently intoxicated, he then indulges in carnal desire by forcefully taking away any of the unmarried village girls for a night of merriment. If the poor girl's parents try to fight back, their house is set on fire. Desperate villagers make a plea to the owner of the tea garden, who calls (presumably) the higher ups in police force and they promise to send someone.

Next day, while crossing a bridge, Kaaliram and his thugs meet a mysterious stranger on a mule, whose face is completely covered in a Sombrero-type hat popular in that region. The stranger, named Abhijeet (Amitabh Bachchan), doesn't seem to be aware of Kaali's reputation and has no hesitation in fighting back strongly. Kaali vows to take revenge, but on a number of subsequent encounters, including a drum-playing competition, Kaali comes up second best every time. However, the ever so loyal police inspector (Asit Sen), always comes to his rescue and prevents him from being sent to jail. However, Kaali's frustration grows.

In the meanwhile, Abhijeet meets and falls in love with Rajni (Raakhee), the blind daughter of the Boro Babu. One rainy night, Kaali attempts to molest Rajni, but Abhijeet comes to her rescue. When the police inspector again attempts to drag his feet, Abhijeet erupts in anger, shows his identity as a very high level police officer, throws Kaali into jail, and suspends the police officer.

Abhijeet marries Rajni and they settle down in a quaint little village named Sonarpur, awaiting the birth of their first child. Meanwhile, Kaalia gets out of jail and finds the whereabouts of Abhijeet and Rajni. He sends Abhijeet away from home by making a fake call for help, and then, enters Abhijeet's home and attacks Rajni, killing the unborn child.

A clue found outside the house ties Kaali with the incident, and Abhijeet confronts him. However, as he is about to drag the handcuffed Kaalia to the police station, Sahuji, in an attempt to shoot Abhijeet, ends up killing his son. The story ends with justice, divine and otherwise, presumed to have been served to all (except the unborn child).

Cast
 Amitabh Bachchan as Inspector Abhijeet Rai
 Raakhee as Rajni  (Tamosha in Bengali version)
 Amjad Khan as Kaaliram Sahu
 Abhi Bhattacharya as Suresh / Boro Babu (Rajni's father)
 Utpal Dutt as Hariya Sahu (Kaaliram's father)
 Prema Narayan as Phulwa (Village belle)
 Asit Sen as Police inspector
 Sujit Kumar
 Nimu Bhowmik

Soundtrack

Hindi

Bengali

References

External links
 
 

1981 films
1980s Hindi-language films
1980s Bengali-language films
Films directed by Shakti Samanta
Films scored by R. D. Burman
Indian multilingual films
1981 multilingual films
Films based on works by Shaktipada Rajguru